Dasht Rural District is in Silvaneh District of Urmia County, West Azerbaijan province, Iran. At the National Census of 2006, its population was 8,647 in 1,541 households. There were 9,012 inhabitants in 2,002 households at the following census of 2011. At the most recent census of 2016, the population of the rural district was 10,199 in 2,302 households. The largest of its 32 villages was Razhan, with 3,783 people.

References 

Urmia County

Rural Districts of West Azerbaijan Province

Populated places in West Azerbaijan Province

Populated places in Urmia County